Propylisopropyltryptamine (PiPT) is a chemical in the tryptamine family, which reportedly produces psychedelic and hallucinogenic effects that resemble those of other related dialkyl tryptamine derivatives, although PiPT is reportedly relatively weak and short lasting. It has been sold as a designer drug, first being identified in 2021 in British Columbia, Canada.

Chemistry

PiPT is short for N-propyl-N-isopropyl-tryptamine. PiPT is a tryptamine, which all belong to a larger family of compounds known as indolethylamines.  PiPT is closely related to the compounds DPT and DiPT.

Dosage

PiPT is reported as being active at doses of 50-100mg orally, or 25mg smoked.

Effects

Very little is known about the psychopharmacological properties of PiPT, but reports suggest it produces psychedelic effects similar to those of other hallucinogenic tryptamine derivatives, that can last around 2-4 hours.

Dangers

There have been no reported deaths or hospitalizations from PiPT, but its safety profile is unknown.

Legality

PiPT is unscheduled and uncontrolled in the United States, but possession and sales of PiPT could be prosecuted under the Federal Analog Act because of its structural similarities to other hallucinogenic tryptamine derivatives.

See also
N,N-Dimethyltryptamine
α-Methyltryptamine

References

External links

Psychedelic tryptamines